Johnny be good could refer to:
 Johnny Be Good, a 1988 film starring Anthony Michael Hall. 
 "Johnny B. Goode", a 1958 rock and roll song written, and first sung, by Chuck Berry.